Tek Bahadur Rai is a Bhutanese politician who has been a member of the National Assembly of Bhutan, since October 2018.

Education
He holds a Bachelor of Technology degree from Ajmer Institute of Engineering and Technology, Rajasthan.

Political career
Before joining politics, he was a civil engineer and worked as a project engineer.

He was elected to the National Assembly of Bhutan as a candidate of DNT from Shompangkha constituency in 2018 Bhutanese National Assembly election. He received 7,018 votes and defeated Deo Kumar Rimal, a candidate of DPT.

References 

1978 births
Living people
Bhutanese MNAs 2018–2023
Druk Nyamrup Tshogpa politicians
Druk Nyamrup Tshogpa MNAs
Bhutanese people of Nepalese descent
Rai people